Cladonia leporina is a species of lichen in the family Cladoniaceae. It was described as a new species in 1831 by Swedish mycologist Elias Magnus Fries. In North America, it is colloquially known as the "jester lichen". A sighting of a population of the lichen in New York (state) is the northernmost known occurrence of this species.

See also
List of Cladonia species

References

leporina
Lichen species
Lichens described in 1831
Lichens of Europe
Lichens of North America
Taxa named by Elias Magnus Fries